Loleza Peak is a  mountain in Mbeya Region, Tanzania, East Africa. It is located in the Mbeya Range, just north of the city of Mbeya. It is the type locale for the moth Zamarada loleza.

References

External links
 
 

Mountains of Tanzania
Geography of Mbeya Region